Amblyodon is a genus of mosses belonging to the family Meesiaceae.

The genus was first described by Palisot de Beauvois.

The species of this genus are found in Europe and Northern America.

Species:
 Amblyodon dealbatus (Sw. ex Hedw.) P.Beauv.

References

Splachnales
Moss genera